George Francis Houck (July 9, 1847 – March 26, 1916) was Chancellor of the Roman Catholic Diocese of Cleveland.
He also wrote Volume One of the 1903 A History of Catholicity in Northern Ohio and the Diocese of Cleveland from 1749 to December 31, 1900, an overview history of Roman Catholicism in northern Ohio beginning with Catholic missions in the American frontier of the Ohio Country, one of the first settled parts of the Midwestern United States, and concluding with a history of the Cleveland diocese through the end of the 19th century.

Early life
Houck was born July 9, 1847, in Tiffin, Ohio. His parents were John and Odile (Fischer) Houck. They were natives of Germany. His father immigrated to this country from the Grand Duchy of Baden when he was four years old, his mother when she was ten years old. They were married February 16, 1846. For forty years John Houck was a shoe merchant in Tiffin. For two years, when Houck was eighteen years old and his father was sick, Houck took complete charge of the business.

Houck attended St. Joseph's parochial school in Tiffin. He subsequently spent two years in Heidelberg College also in Tiffin. He entered Mount St. Mary's Seminary of the West in Cincinnati, in 1867. He pursued his studies in that institution until 1874. While there he was the seminary's bookkeeper, and was also assistant librarian for five years. He was then called by Bishop Richard Gilmour to Saint Mary Seminary and Graduate School of Theology, Cleveland.

Priesthood
Houck received Holy Orders July 4, 1875, from Bishop Edward Fitzgerald of the Roman Catholic Diocese of Little Rock, in Cleveland, then performing the duties of Gilmour, who suffered a mental breakdown in 1874 and was in southern France for recuperation.

Houck's first assignment as a priest, soon after his ordination, was as pastor of St. Joseph's Church, Crestline, Ohio. In July 1877, he was appointed Secretary to Gilmour, with duties of chancellor; in May 1882, he was appointed the Chancellor also. Michael W. Carr, of the Catholic Historical Society, described Houck as "the most painstaking, faithful, and efficient chancellor and secretary in any diocese in the country".

For seventeen years, 1877–1894, he was chaplain of the Cleveland workhouse, a type of prison in which the sentence includes manual labor.

In July 1877, Houck was appointed chaplain of St. Vincent's Charity Hospital, Cleveland.

St. John's and St. Joseph's Cemeteries, up until 1878, were managed by the curates of Cathedral of St. John the Evangelist; in 1878, Gilmour appointed Houck manager of both cemeteries.

Despite the rapid growth in Cleveland's population, the amount of land set aside for use as burial grounds remained unchanged until 1893 when Calvary Cemetery was purchased. That year, Bishop Ignatius Frederick Horstmann appointed Houck manager of this additional cemetery to oversee improvements of the property. This new  cemetery, in Newburgh Township, was easily reached by tram from all parts of the city. On November 26, 1894, Houck, as Horstmann's delegate, consecrated one-half of the grounds. He reformed and systematized the operations of the cemeteries under his management. Carr described the positive changes:

In 1900, an additional  were purchased making the entire cemetery site one hundred acres in extent. During the same year, also, an electric funeral car was introduced, which rapidly grew in public favor.

He celebrated, on July 24, 1902, his twenty-fifth anniversary as Chancellor. Horstmann and over one-hundred-sixty priests were present.

Writing in 1903, Carr further described Houck:

On July 25, 1904, Pope Pius X granted him the title Monsignor.

Houck died on March 26, 1916, and he is buried at St. Joseph Catholic Cemetery in Tiffin, Ohio.

Historical writing
In 1888 Houck wrote A Memoir of the Life and Labors of the Right Rev. Amadeus Rappe, D.D., First Bishop of Cleveland.

In 1889–1890, he published The Church in Northern Ohio and in the Diocese of Cleveland, which was printed in one German language and three English language editions.

He expanded and revised The Church in Northern Ohio and in the Diocese of Cleveland: from 1817 to September, 1887 with additional facts and published it as Volume One of the 1903 A History of Catholicity in Northern Ohio and the Diocese of Cleveland from 1749 to December 31, 1900.

Horstmann concluded his approbation of Houck's Volume One of the 1903 A History of Catholicity in Northern Ohio and the Diocese of Cleveland from 1749 to December 31, 1900, with two verses from the New Testament:
"Gather up the fragments lest they be lost", from the Multiplication of the Loaves, translated for the 21st century as, "When they had had their fill, he said to his disciples, 'Gather the fragments left over, so that nothing will be wasted.
"Go and do in like manner", from the parable of the Good Samaritan who binds up wounds, translated for the 21st century as: "Jesus said to him, 'Go and do likewise.
Horstmann's approbation should be seen in the context of his interest in history. Horstmann and Houck were both listed, on the same page with some important figures in the history of the diocese, as donors of materials to the American Catholic Historical Society of Philadelphia.
Horstmann was an organizing member, since 1884, while he was still a priest and later Chancellor of the Roman Catholic Archdiocese of Philadelphia.
Horstmann wrote, in his approbation, that he understood this work to be a model history for other dioceses and took credit for proposing a diocesan history.
 Houck's other works did not include an approbation.

Works or publications
Houck's newer published works are revisions and expansions of his older works. His subjects are northern Ohio Catholic Church history and biographies of Catholics in northern Ohio.

Notes

References

1847 births
1916 deaths
American Roman Catholic priests
Contributors to the Catholic Encyclopedia
Roman Catholic Diocese of Cleveland
Writers from Cleveland